Daniel or Danny Mills may refer to:
Daniel W. Mills (1838–1904), U.S. Representative from Illinois
Daniel Yarnton Mills (1849–1904), Scottish chess master
Daniel Mills (biologist) (born 1966), English biologist
Danny Mills (born 1977), English international football player for Leeds United and Manchester City, among others
Danny Mills (footballer, born 1975), English football player for Barnet
Danny Mills (footballer, born 1991), English football player for Peterborough United, among others
Danny Mills (rugby league), rugby league player for the Batley Bulldogs